Hydroxylammonium chloride is a chemical compound with the formula . It is the hydrochloric acid salt of hydroxylamine. Hydroxylamine is a biological intermediate in nitrification (biological oxidation of ammonia with oxygen into nitrite) and in anammox (biological oxidation of nitrite and ammonium into dinitrogen gas) which are important in the nitrogen cycle in soil and in wastewater treatment plants.

Applications
Hydroxylammonium chloride is used in organic synthesis for preparation of oximes and hydroxamic acids from carboxylic acids, N- and O- substituted hydroxylamines, and addition reactions of carbon-carbon double bond.

During the acetyl bromide method of extracting lignin from lignocellulosic biomass, hydroxylammonium chloride can be used to remove bromine and polybromide from the solution.

In surface treatments, it is used in the preparation of anti-skinning agents, corrosion inhibitors, and cleaner additives. It is also a starting material for pharmaceuticals and agrochemicals manufacturing. In the rubber and plastics industries, it is an antioxidant, vulcanization accelerator, and radical scavenger.

It is also used as a fixative for textile dyes, auxiliary in some dyeing processes, as a metal extraction and flotation aid, as an antioxidant in fatty acids and soaps, and as a color stabilizer and emulsion additive in color films.

It is also used in analytic chemistry in the analysis of iron in the water combined with α,α-dipyridyl. The hydroxylammonium chloride transforms all the iron in Fe2+, that then forms a coordination complex with the dipyridyl.

References
 
 

Chlorides
Hydroxylammonium compounds
Photographic chemicals